Rud-e Posht (also Romanized as Rūd-e Posht; also known as Rūd-e Posht-e Bālā) is a village in Katra Rural District, Nashta District, Tonekabon County, Mazandaran Province, Iran. At the 2006 census, its population was 529, in 140 families.

References 

Populated places in Tonekabon County